Francisco Serrano may refer to:

St. Francis Serrano (died 1748), Dominican priest martyred in China
Francisco Serrano, 1st Duke of la Torre (1810–1885), Spanish marshal and statesman
Francisco R. Serrano (1886–1927), Mexican general and politician
Francisco Layna Serrano (1893–1971), Spanish doctor and historian
Francisco J. Serrano (1900–1982), Mexican civil engineer and architect
J. Francisco Serrano Cacho (born 1937), his son, Mexican architect
Francisco Serrano (poet) (born 1949), Mexican poet and writer
Francisco Serrano Castro (born 1965), Spanish judge and politician
Carlos Francisco Serrano (born 1978), Colombian footballer
Francisco Serrano (triathlete) (born 1980), Mexican triathlete